Comin' on Home is an album by American organist Richard Groove Holmes recorded in 1971 and released on the Blue Note label. The album was Holmes' only release on the label.

Reception
The Allmusic review awarded the album 3 stars.

Track listing
All compositions by Richard Groove Holmes except as indicated
 "Groovin' for Mr. G." - 4:13
 "Theme from Love Story" (Francis Lai, Carl Sigman) - 3:38
 "Mr. Clean" (Weldon Irvine) - 5:04
 "Down Home Funk" (Irvine) - 5:21
 "Don't Mess With Me" - 6:47
 "Wave" (Antônio Carlos Jobim) - 5:48
 "This Here" (Bobby Timmons) - 5:05

Personnel
Richard Groove Holmes - organ
Weldon Irvine - electric piano (tracks 1 & 3-7)
Gerald Hubbard - guitar
Jerry Jemmott (tracks 1 & 3-7), Chuck Rainey (track 2) - electric bass
Darryl Washington - drums
Ray Armando - conga (tracks 1-6)
James Davis - tambourine, shaker, cowbell, voice (tracks 1 & 3-7)

References

Blue Note Records albums
Richard Holmes (organist) albums
1971 albums
Albums recorded at Van Gelder Studio
Albums produced by George Butler (record producer)
Jazz-funk albums